The Redstone Rocket may refer to:

Redstone (rocket)
The Redstone Rocket, a military newspaper serving Redstone Arsenal (near Huntsville, Alabama).
A nickname for Jeff Locke